Pavel Vladimirovich Prygunov (born 1 October 1976) is a former Russian professional footballer.

Club career
He made his professional debut in the Russian Second Division in 1994 for FC Rubin Kazan. He played 5 games in the UEFA Intertoto Cup 1996 for FC KAMAZ-Chally Naberezhnye Chelny.

References

1976 births
Footballers from Kazan
Living people
Russian footballers
Association football midfielders
Russian Premier League players
FC Rubin Kazan players
FC KAMAZ Naberezhnye Chelny players
FC Elista players
FC Orenburg players
FC Neftekhimik Nizhnekamsk players